Baron Dover is a title that has been created three times, once in the Peerage of England, once in the Peerage of Great Britain and once in the Peerage of the United Kingdom. All three creations are now extinct.

The first creation came in the Peerage of England in 1685 when Henry Jermyn was made Baron Dover. In 1703 he also succeeded his elder brother as Baron Jermyn. For more information on this creation, see the latter title.

The second creation came in the Peerage of Great Britain in 1788 when then soldier General Sir Joseph Yorke was made Lord Dover, Baron of the Town and Port of Dover, in the County of Kent. He was the third son of Philip Yorke, 1st Earl of Hardwicke. The peerage became extinct on Lord Dover's death in 1792.

The third creation came in the Peerage of the United Kingdom in 1831 when the politician George Agar-Ellis was created Baron Dover, of Dover in the County of Kent. He was the only son of Henry Ellis, 2nd Viscount Clifden. For more information on this creation, see Viscount Clifden.

Barons Dover (1685)
see Baron Jermyn

Barons Dover (1788)
Joseph Yorke, 1st Baron Dover (1724–1792)

Barons Dover (1831)
see Viscount Clifden

See also
Duke of Dover
Earl of Dover
Earl of Hardwicke

References
Kidd, Charles, Williamson, David (editors). Debrett's Peerage and Baronetage (1990 edition). New York: St Martin's Press, 1990.

The London Gazette

1685 establishments in England
Extinct baronies in the Peerage of England
Extinct baronies in the Peerage of Great Britain
Yorke family
Extinct baronies in the Peerage of the United Kingdom
Noble titles created in 1685
Noble titles created in 1788
Noble titles created in 1831
Noble titles created for UK MPs